The  is an electric multiple unit (EMU) commuter train type operated by the private railway operator Kintetsu Railway since 2000. In 2001, it was awarded the Laurel Prize, presented annually by the Japan Railfan Club.

Operations
The 9020 series sets operate on Nara Line services, including through-running to and from Hanshin Electric Railway lines. One 9050 series variant operates on Osaka Line services.

Formations
, the fleet consists of 20 two-car sets, with 19 based at Higashihanazono Depot for Nara Line services, and one set based at Takayasu Depot for use on Osaka Line services.

Higashihanazono Depot sets
The two-car Nara Line sets are formed as follows, with one motored (M) car and one non-powered trailer (T) car, and the "Mc" car at the Namba/Kyoto end.

The "Mc" car is fitted with two cross-arm or single-arm pantographs.

Takayasu Depot set
The sole two-car Osaka Line set, 9051, is formed as follows, with one motored (M) car and one non-powered trailer (T) car, and the "Tc" car at the Osaka Uehommachi end.

The "Mc" car is fitted with two single-arm pantographs.

Interior
Passenger accommodation consists of longitudinal bench seating throughout.

See also
 Kintetsu 9820 series, six-car sets based on the 9020 series design
 Kintetsu 6820 series, a narrow-gauge derivative of the 9020 series

References

External links

 Kintetsu "Series 21" (3220/5820/9020/9820/6820 series) train information 

Electric multiple units of Japan
9020 series
Train-related introductions in 2000
Kinki Sharyo multiple units
1500 V DC multiple units of Japan